Management Communication Quarterly is a peer-reviewed academic journal that covers the field of communication studies pertaining to management and organizational communication. The editor-in-chief is Rebecca Meisenbach (University of Missouri). It was established in 1987 and is published by SAGE Publications.

Abstracting and indexing
The journal is abstracted and indexed in Scopus and the Social Sciences Citation Index. According to the Journal Citation Reports, its 2020 impact factor is 2.340.

References

External links
 

SAGE Publishing academic journals
English-language journals
Business and management journals
Communication journals
Publications established in 1987
Quarterly journals